Galatasaray is the women's basketball section of Galatasaray S.K., a major sports club in Istanbul, Turkey. Galatasaray women's basketball team play matches in Ahmet Cömert Sport Hall which has a seating capacity for 3,500 spectators.

The team recently won the 2013–14 EuroLeague Women and the Turkish Women's Basketball League title after beating Fenerbahçe Women's Basketball in the finals. Galatasaray is the most successful club in European competitions, having won 3 major trophies, and being the only Turkish club to have won the Euroleague competition for women.

Sponsorship naming
Due to sponsorship deals, Galatasaray have been also known as:

 Galatasaray (1954–2010)
 Galatasaray Medical Park (2010–2012)
 Galatasaray (2012–2013)
 Galatasaray OdeaBank (2013–2015)
 Galatasaray (2015–2022)
 Galatasaray Çağdaş Faktoring (2022–present)

Home courts

Players

Current squad

Depth chart

Honours

International competitions

 EuroLeague Women
 Winners (1): 2013–14
 Third (1): 1998–99
 Fifth (1): 2011–12
 FIBA EuroCup
 Winners (2): 2008–09, 2017–18
 Third (2): 2007–08, 2021–22
 Fourth (1): 2016–17
 European Super Cup
 Runners-up (2): 2009, 2018

Domestic competitions
 Turkish Women's Basketball League
 Winners (13): 1987–88, 1989–90, 1990–91, 1991–92, 1992–93, 1993–94, 1994–95, 1995–96, 1996–97, 1997–1998, 1999–2000, 2013–14, 2014–15
 Runners-up (4): 2007–08, 2009–10, 2010–11, 2012–13, 2020–21
 Turkish Cup
 Winners (11): 1992–93, 1993–94, 1994–95, 1995–96, 1996–97, 1997–98, 2009–10, 2010–11, 2011–12, 2012–13, 2013-14 
 Runners-up (5): 1998–99, 1999–2000, 2000–01, 2008–09, 2015–16
 Turkish Super Cup
 Winners (8): 1993, 1994, 1995, 1996, 1997, 1998, 2008, 2011
 Runners-up (5): 2010, 2012, 2013, 2014, 2015

Technical staff

Team captains

Head coaches

See also

 See also Galatasaray S.K. (men's basketball)
 See also Galatasaray S.K. (wheelchair basketball)

References

External links
 Galatasaray S.K. official website 
 Unofficial Fan Site and Forum 
 Turkish Women Basketball League 

 
Sport in Istanbul
Women's basketball teams in Turkey
Basketball teams established in 1986
EuroCup Women-winning clubs
EuroLeague Women clubs
Galatasaray Basketball